Eupithecia grappleri is a moth in the family Geometridae. It is found in the region of Magallanes and Antarctica Chilena (Esperanza Province) in Chile. The habitat consists of the 
Southern Pacific Biotic Province.

The length of the forewings is about 8.5 mm for males. The forewings are pale greyish white, with dark brown areas on the costa at the base. The hindwings are greyish white, with numerous grey and brown scales.

Etymology
The specific name is based on the type locality.

References

Moths described in 1987
grappleri
Moths of South America
Endemic fauna of Chile